USS S-17 (SS-122) was a second-group (S-3 or "Government") S-class submarine of the United States Navy.

Construction and commissioning

S-17′s keel was laid down on 19 March 1918 by the Lake Torpedo Boat Company in Bridgeport, Connecticut. She was launched on 22 May 1920, sponsored by Mrs. Raymond G. Thomas, and commissioned on 1 March 1921.

Service history

1921–1935
Departing from New London, Connecticut, on 31 May 1921, S-17 sailed via the Panama Canal, California, Hawaii, and Guam to the Philippines, arriving at Cavite, Luzon, on 1 December. In 1922, she sailed from Manila Bay on 11 October, visited Hong Kong from 14–28 October, and returned to Cavite on 1 November. Sailing from Manila on 15 May 1923, S-17 visited Shanghai, Chefoo, and Chinwangtao, before returning via Woosung and Amoy to Cavite on 11 September. In the summer of 1924, she visited Shanghai, Tsingtao, Chefoo, and Chinwangtao, before returning via Chefoo and Amoy to Olongapo, Luzon, on 23 September. Departing Cavite on 29 October, she arrived at Mare Island, California, on 31 December.

Remaining at Mare Island in 1925 and 1926, she operated along the California coast in 1927, mainly at Mare Island, California, San Diego, California, and San Pedro Submarine Base, San Pedro, California. From February 1928 into December 1934, S-17 served in the Panama Canal area. Departing from Coco Solo on 10 December 1934, S-17 was decommissioned on 29 March 1935 at Philadelphia, Pennsylvania.

1940–1944
S-17 was recommissioned on 16 December 1940. After voyages to Bermuda, S-17 operated in the Panama Canal area from December 1941 to February 1942. On 28 February 1942, she was operating at periscope depth when a United States Marine Corps plane dropped a  bomb targeting her periscope. Later in the day, the same or a different Marine Corps plane dropped a  bomb that landed within  of her while she was on the surface. S-17 suffered no damage or casualties in either incident.

S-17 operatwed from Saint Thomas in the United States Virgin Islands, in March 1942 and in the Panama Canal area again from April to August 1942. S-17′s crew identified the attacking aircraft as a U.S. Army Air Forces B-25 Mitchell bomber, and one source describes it as a U.S. Navy PV-1 Ventura patrol bomber, but an official report on the incident identifies the plane as a U.S. Army Air Forces B-18 Bolo bomber. S-17 arrived at Coco Solo in the Panama Canal Zone on 8 August 1942 for repairs.

S-17 operated from New London from September 1942 to July 1944. Her cruises from New London often included operations in Casco Bay, Maine.

Decommissioning and disposal
Decommissioned on 4 October 1944, S-17 was struck from the Naval Vessel Register on 13 November 1944. She was intentionally sunk on 5 April 1945.

In literature 

A fictional USS S-17 appears in Edward L. Beach's 1955 novel Run Silent, Run Deep.

References 

United States S-class submarines
World War II submarines of the United States
Ships built in Bridgeport, Connecticut
1920 ships
Ships sunk as targets
Maritime incidents in February 1942
Maritime incidents in August 1942
Friendly fire incidents of World War II
Maritime incidents in April 1945
Scuttled vessels